Harald Winkler (born 17 December 1962) is an Austrian bobsledder who competed in the late 1980s and early 1990s. He won a gold medal in the four-man event with teammates Ingo Appelt, Gerhard Haidacher and Thomas Schroll at the 1992 Winter Olympics in Albertville.

Winkler also won two medals in the four-man event at the FIBT World Championships with a silver in 1993 and a bronze in 1990.

References
Bobsleigh four-man Olympic medalists for 1924, 1932-56, and since 1964
Bobsleigh four-man world championship medalists since 1930
DatabaseOlympics.com profile

1962 births
Austrian male bobsledders
Bobsledders at the 1988 Winter Olympics
Bobsledders at the 1992 Winter Olympics
Bobsledders at the 1994 Winter Olympics
Living people
Olympic bobsledders of Austria
Olympic gold medalists for Austria
Olympic medalists in bobsleigh
Medalists at the 1992 Winter Olympics